Lauren Pritchard may refer to:

 Lauren Pritchard (actress) (born 1977), American actress
 Lauren Pritchard (singer) (born 1987), American singer